The Leader of the Opposition in Lok Sabha is an elected Member of Lok Sabha who leads the official opposition in the Lower House of the Parliament of India. The Leader of the Opposition is the parliamentary chairperson of the largest political party in the Lok Sabha that is not in government (provided that said political party has at least 10% of the seats in the Lok Sabha). The post is vacant since 26 May 2014, as no opposition party has 10% Seats.

History
In Lok Sabha until 1969, there was de facto opposition leader with no formal recognition, status or privilege. Later, the leader of the opposition was given official recognition and their salary and allowances was extended by the Act, 1977. Since then, the leader in the Lok Sabha should satisfy three conditions, namely,

 he should be a member of the House 
 of the party in opposition to the Government having the greatest numerical strength and
 be recognised by the Speaker of the Lok Sabha

In December 1969, the Congress Party (O) was recognised as the main opposition party in the parliament while its leader, Ram Subhag Singh plays the role of opposition leader.

Leaders of the Opposition in the Lok Sabha 
The Lok Sabha did not recognise an official Leader of the Opposition until 1969. The position was also vacant between 1980 and 1989 and at present, since 2014.

See also

 Vice-President of India (Chairperson of the Rajya Sabha)
 Deputy Chairman of the Rajya Sabha
 Leader of the Opposition in Rajya Sabha
 Leader of the House in Rajya Sabha
 Leader of the House in Lok Sabha
 Secretary General of the Lok Sabha

References

Further reading 
 

Lists of members of the Lok Sabha
Leaders of the Opposition
India